Giusi Raspani Dandolo (23 August 1916 – 14 January 2000) was an Italian stage, film, television and radio actress.

Life and career 
Born in Trani, the daughter of a magistrate, Raspani Dandolo enrolled at the Bolzano Conservatory as to become an opera singer, but eventually abandoned her studies to move to Rome, where in 1940 she graduated from the Accademia d'Arte Drammatica. She made her professional debut in 1941, with the stage company of Laura Adani. Mainly active on stage, she got critical acclaim for her performances at the Piccolo Teatro under the direction of Giorgio Strehler.

She was also active in films, TV-series and on radio.

Selected filmography 

 The Steamship Owner (1951)
Passionate Song (1953)
The Letters Page (1955) 
Angel in a Taxi (1958) 
You're on Your Own (1959) 
Con rispetto parlando (1965) 
Rita the Mosquito (1966)
A Maiden for a Prince (1966)
Don't Sting the Mosquito (1967)
The Long, the Short, the Cat (1967)
La calandria (1972)
Due cuori, una cappella (1975)
Substitute Teacher (1975)
Coeds (1976)

References

External links 
 

1916 births
2000 deaths
People from Trani
Italian film actresses
Italian television actresses
Italian radio actresses
Italian stage actresses
20th-century Italian actresses